Phayahong Ayothayafightgym is a Thai muay thai kickboxer and the former K-1 Women's Atomweight champion.

As of July 2022, she is ranked as the eight best female pound for pound kickboxer in the world according to Combat Press.

Career

Muay Thai
Phayahong started training in Muay Thai at the age of 9 years old in order to help her family. She had her first fights for the Sor.Sutthichai camp in the Buriram province and gained her first regional title at the age of 13.

On February 25, 2018 Phayahong faced COMACHI at KODO 3 for the interim WPMF World Pinweight title. She won the fight by unanimous decision. They rematched on February 24, 2019 at KODO 4 in Japan for the undisputed WPMF World Pinweight title. Phayahong won the fight by unanimous decision.

On March 28, 2021 Phayahong faced Faachiangrai Sor.Saenchai in Nakhon Ratchasima for the Thailand 102 lbs belt. She won the fight by decision to capture the title.

Phayahong faced Lookmee P.K.Viengchan at Legends Fighting Championships	on September 3, 2022. She won the fight by a second-round technical knockout. Phayahong made her next appearance with Legends Fight Championship on November 20, 2022, as she was booked to face Margaret Wanek. She won the fight by decision.

Kickboxing career
Phayahong challenged the Krush Women's Atomweight champion Miho Takanashi in her promotional debut at Krush 106 on October 13, 2019. She lost the fight by unanimous decision.

Phayahong faced Moe Takahashi at Krush 111 on February 24, 2020, in her second appearance with the organization. She won the fight by unanimous decision.

On May 12, 2022, K-1 announced that they would be holding an atomweight Grand Prix, which would crown the inaugural champion, at the all-female kickboxing card at K-1: Ring of Venus on June 25, 2022. Phayahong faced the four-time Shoot Boxing tournament winner Mio Tsumura in the tournament quarterfinals, which she won by unanimous decision. Phayahong advanced to the tournament finals, where she faced the reigning Krush Atomweight champion Miyuu Sugawara. The fight was ruled a majority decision draw after the first three rounds, with one judge scoring the bout for Phayahong. She was awarded the split decision after an extra fourth round was fought.

Phayahong made her first K-1 Women's Atomweight title defense against Miyuu Sugawara at K-1 World GP 2023: K'Festa 6 on March 12, 2023. It was an immediate rematch of their 2021 K-1 Grand Prix finals bout, which Phayahong won by split decision. She lost the fight by majority decision.

Championships and accomplishments
K-1
2022 K-1 Women's Atomweight Champion

World Professional Muaythai Federation
 2018 interim WPMF World Pinweight Champion
 2019 WPMF World Pinweight Champion

Professional Boxing Association of Thailand (PAT)
 2021 Thailand 102 lbs Champion

International Federation of Muaythai Associations
 2018 I.F.M.A. Youth (14-15) World Championships -45 kg 
 2019 I.F.M.A. Youth (16-17) World Championships -45 kg

Fight record

|- style="background:#fbb;"
| 2023-03-12 || Loss||align=left| Miyuu Sugawara || K-1 World GP 2023: K'Festa 6 || Tokyo, Japan || Decision (Majority) ||  3|| 3:00
|-
! style=background:white colspan=9 |
|-
|-  style="background:#cfc"
| 2022-11-20 || Win ||align=left| Margaret Wanek || Legends Fighting Championships || Phuket, Thailand || Decision || 3 ||3:00

|-  style="background:#cfc"
| 2022-09-03 || Win ||align=left| Lookmee P.K.Viengchan || Legends Fighting Championships || Nakhon Ratchasima, Thailand || TKO (Punches) || 2 || 1:08
|-
|-  style="background:#cfc"
| 2022-06-25|| Win ||align=left| Miyuu Sugawara || K-1: Ring of Venus, Atomweight World Grand Prix Final || Tokyo, Japan || Ext.R Decision (Split)  || 4 || 3:00
|-
! style=background:white colspan=9 |

|-  style="background:#cfc"
| 2022-06-25|| Win ||align=left| MIO || K-1: Ring of Venus, Atomweight World Grand Prix Semifinal || Tokyo, Japan || Decision (Unanimous)  || 3 || 3:00
|-
|-  bgcolor="#fbb"
| 2022-02-05|| Loss||align=left| Celest Hansen || Muay Hardcore || Bangkok, Thailand || Decision (Unanimous) || 3 || 3:00

|-  style="background:#cfc"
| 2021-03-28 || Win ||align=left| Faachiangrai Sor.Saenchai|| Lady Fighter || Nakhon Ratchasima, Thailand || Decision  || 5 || 2:00
|-
! style=background:white colspan=9 |

|-  bgcolor="#cfc"
| 2020-10-10|| Win||align=left| Ayaka Miyauchi || Muay Hardcore || Bangkok, Thailand || Decision (Unanimous)  || 3 || 3:00

|-
|-  style="background:#cfc"
| 2020-02-24 || Win ||align=left| MOE || Krush 111 || Tokyo, Japan || Decision (Unanimous)  || 3 || 3:00
|-
|-  style="background:#fbb"
| 2019-10-13 || Loss ||align=left| Miho Takanashi  || Krush 106 || Tokyo, Japan || Decision (Unanimous)  || 3 || 3:00
|-
! style=background:white colspan=9 |
|-
|-  style="background:#cfc"
| 2019-02-24 || Win ||align=left| COMACHI || KODO 4 || Oita, Japan || Decision (Unanimous)  || 5 || 2:00
|-
! style=background:white colspan=9 |

|-  style="background:#cfc"
| 2018-02-25 || Win ||align=left| COMACHI || KODO 3 || Oita, Japan || Decision (Unanimous)  || 5 || 2:00
|-
! style=background:white colspan=9 |

|-  bgcolor="#c5d2ea"
| 2017-11-26|| Draw ||align=left| Ayaka Miyauchi  || M-ONE 2017 FINAL || Tokyo, Japan || Decision (Split) || 3 || 3:00
|-
| colspan=9 | Legend:    

|-
|-  style="background:#cfc"
| 2019-10-05|| Win ||align=left| Roghayeh Mohammadiyan ||  2019 IFMA Youth World Championships, Final || Antalya, Turkey || Decision (30:29)  ||  || 
|-
! style=background:white colspan=9 |

|-  style="background:#cfc"
| 2019-10-04|| Win ||align=left| Charlie Pritchard ||  2019 IFMA Youth World Championships, Semi Final || Antalya, Turkey || Decision (30:27)  ||  || 

|-  style="background:#cfc"
| 2019-10-02|| Win ||align=left| Sİnem Karakaya ||  2019 IFMA Youth World Championships, Quarter Final || Antalya, Turkey || Decision (30:26)  ||  || 

|-  style="background:#cfc"
| 2018-08-08|| Win ||align=left| Aliaksandra Malchanka ||  2018 IFMA Youth World Championships, Final || Bangkok, Thailand || TKO (Referee stoppage) || 1 || 
|-
! style=background:white colspan=9 |

|-  style="background:#cfc"
| 2018-08-07|| Win ||align=left|  ||  2018 IFMA Youth World Championships, Semi Final || Bangkok, Thailand || TKO  || 1 || 
|-
| colspan=9 | Legend:

See also
 List of female kickboxers
 List of K-1 champions

References

2002 births
Phayahong Ayothayafightgym
Phayahong Ayothayafightgym
Living people
Phayahong Ayothayafightgym
Phayahong Ayothayafightgym
Southeast Asian Games medalists in wushu